Warren Bradley Green (born 31 October 1962) is a former professional tennis player from South Africa.

Biography
Originally from Durban, Green competed on the professional tennis circuit in the 1980s. His uncle, through second wife Marjorie, was England and Fulham footballer Johnny Haynes, who helped Green get set up with accommodation when he moved to London to begin his tennis career.

During his career he twice featured in the singles qualifying draw at Wimbledon and as a doubles player reached the third round of the 1987 Wimbledon Championships, with Pieter Aldrich.

Green, who later immigrated to Australia, married British tennis player Lisa Gould. Their son Chris was born while the couple lived in Durban and he now plays cricket for New South Wales.

Challenger titles

Doubles: (1)

References

External links
 
 

1962 births
Living people
South African male tennis players
South African emigrants to Australia
Sportspeople from Durban